120×570mm NATO tank ammunition (4.7 inch) also known as 120×570mmR is a common, NATO-standard (STANAG 4385), tank gun semi-combustible cartridge used by 120mm smoothbore guns, superseding the earlier 105×617mmR cartridge used in NATO-standard rifled tank guns.

History 
The 120×570R cartridge was originally intended for the German Rh-120 smoothbore gun but an interoperability agreement signed between West Germany and France in April1979, followed in September1981 by a project to install the M256 120 mm smoothbore gun on future M1A1 Abrams tanks made it a NATO standard.

Characteristics 
The 120×570mm are one-piece ammunition with semi-combustible cartridge cases. These incorporate a short, metallic stub case with an elastomeric sealing ring which allows the use of a normal sliding wedge type of breech and at the same time significantly reduces the weight of the rounds. Thus, a round of 120 mm Rheinmetall APFSDS ammunition has a mass of 19.8 kg, which is little more than the 18 kg mass of a typical 105 mm APFSDS round with the traditional metallic cartridge case.

Ammunition

Armour-Piercing Fin-Stabilized Discarding Sabot (APFSDS) 

There are different ways to measure APFSDS penetration value. NATO uses the 50% (This means that 50% of the shell had to go through the plate), while the Soviet/Russian standard is higher (80% had to go through). According to authorities like Paul Lakowski, the difference in performance can reach as much as 8%

High Explosive Anti-Tank (HEAT)

High Explosive (HE)

Close Combat

Guided munition

Target Practice Tracer (TP-T)

Weapon platforms
 Rh-120 L/44, used on the Leopard 2 and Type 90 MBTs
 Rh-120 L/55, used on later Leopard 2 variants including the Leopard 2E
 Rh-120 L/55A1, foreseen for the Challenger 3
 M256, used on the M1 Abrams and M60-2000
 M256E1
 XM360
 XM360E1
 CN120-25, used on the AMX-32, AMX-40, and EE-T1 Osório
 CN120-26, used on the Leclerc
 120 FER
 MG251, used on the Merkava III
 IMI MG251-LR used on the Merkava IV
 MG253 used on the M60 Sabra
 OTO Melara-Breda 120/44, used on the C1 Ariete
 GT-9
 CTG, used on the CV90120 and WPB Anders
 KM256, used on the K1A1
 CN03, used on the K1A2
 CN08, used on the K2 Black Panther
 MKE 120 mm tank gun, used on the Altay (main battle tank)
 KBM-2, used on the T-72-120, T-84-120 Yatagan, and on the PT-17
 Type 10, used on the Type 10
 Cockerill XC-8-120, used on the K21-120 medium tank

See also 
 105×617mm tank gun ammunition
 125 mm smoothbore ammunition used by Russia and China

Notes

References 

 DIRECT FIRE AMMUNITION Handbook 2019, Project Manager Maneuver Ammunition Systems 

Artillery
Ammunition
NATO cartridges
Military equipment of NATO
Large-caliber cartridges